

John Morris Taylor (10 October 1895 – 12 May 1971) was an Australian cricket and rugby union player.

He attended Newington College (1906–1915) and St Andrew's College within the University of Sydney. He served with the First Australian Imperial Force as an artillery gunner in World War I and at the conclusion of the war was selected to be part of the Australian Imperial Forces cricket team which played 28 first class matches in Britain, South Africa and Australia.

Cricket career
Taylor played in 20 Tests between 1920 and 1926 and held the Australian 10th wicket partnership record with Arthur Mailey, set in Sydney in 1924/25 against England until broken by Phil Hughes and Ashton Agar on 11 July 2013.

Rugby union career
Taylor also played two rugby union tests for the Wallabies against the New Zealand Maoris in 1922.

References

External links

1895 births
1971 deaths
Australia Test cricketers
New South Wales cricketers
Australian rugby union players
Australia international rugby union players
People educated at Newington College
Australian dentists
Australian cricketers
Australian Imperial Force Touring XI cricketers
20th-century dentists
Rugby union players from Sydney
Rugby union fly-halves